Patrick Lee is a medical researcher and professor.

He discovered that reovirus preferentially replicates in Ras transformed cells and is therefore a good candidate for cancer therapy.

Dr. Lee holds a Ph.D. in biochemistry from the University of Alberta.

He is currently a faculty member at Dalhousie University.

External links
Patrick Lee's faculty page at the University of Calgary
Patrick Lee's faculty page at Dalhousie University

Canadian medical researchers
Living people
Members of the United States National Academy of Sciences
Year of birth missing (living people)